Matthew Ray Bennett (born April 9, 1968) is a Canadian actor, writer and director. He is best known for portraying Detective Len Harper on Cold Squad and his recurring roles as Aaron Doral cylon model number five in the reimagined Battlestar Galactica and Daniel Rosen in Orphan Black.

Career
At the age of 20 he moved from his hometown of Toronto, Ontario to Vancouver, British Columbia to pursue an acting career. He studied theatre school for two years and after that acted in TV series including The X-Files and The Commish and telefilms such as A Killer Among Friends, Anything for Love and Relentless: Mind of a Killer. He currently lives in Vancouver but works in Toronto as well.

Matthew is best known for his part as Detective Len Harper on the Canadian police drama Cold Squad for which he has been nominated for both a Gemini and Leo award. Next to that he played the lead role of Lieutenant James Calley on the Showtime series Total Recall 2070 and the 1998 telefilm by the same name. Next to that, he guest starred in many TV series like Stargate SG-1, The Peacemakers, Da Vinci's Inquest, Criminal Minds and At the Hotel. In recent years, Bennett has had a recurring guest role on the Sci Fi Channel television program Battlestar Galactica. Playing the character Aaron Doral, a Cylon, he first appeared in the 2003 mini-series and his final appearance was in the series finale in March 2009. However, Bennett also appeared in the TV movie Battlestar Galactica: The Plan.

Personal life
Bennett was married to actress Brittaney Bennett (formerly Brittaney Edgell), best known for her parts on series as Highlander, Forever Knight and Earth: Final Conflict. She also stars in her husband's writing and directing debut, the 2008 movie Kick Me Down.

Filmography

Actor

Writer

Director

Awards

References

External links 
 
 

1968 births
Living people
Canadian male television actors
Male actors from Toronto
Male actors from Vancouver
20th-century Canadian male actors
21st-century Canadian male actors
Film directors from Toronto
Film directors from Vancouver
Writers from Toronto
Writers from Vancouver
Canadian male screenwriters
21st-century Canadian screenwriters
21st-century Canadian male writers